{{DISPLAYTITLE:C24H32O4}}
The molecular formula C24H32O4 may refer to:

 Estradiol butyrylacetate
 Etynodiol diacetate
 Estradiol dipropionate
 Megestrol acetate
 16-Methylene-17α-hydroxyprogesterone acetate
 18-Methylsegesterone acetate